Avedis Guidanian (born 21 November 1966) is the former Minister of Tourism in Lebanon. He is member of the ARF political party.

Biography

Early life 
Avedis Guidanian was born on 21 November 1966. He had enrolled his secondary education in Armenian Catholic Mesrobian High School. He holds a degree in Physics from the Lebanese University.

Life as ARF party member 
He is member of Armenian Revolutionary Federation and had various roles in it. He was chosen as the chairman of Zavarian Student Association of ARF and represented the party in the group of Lebanese parties as well as in numerous assemblies. He had participated in political parties' international assemblies that were held in Kazakhstan and Cambodia.

In 1998, he was elected as member of ARF Central Committee of Lebanon for the first time. From 2001 till 2005 he was the foreman of ARF Central Committee of Lebanon. Since 2009, he has been the principal of Voice of Van. In 2015, he was elected as the vice-representative of ARF Central Committee of Lebanon.

Personal life 
He is married and has two children.

References 

Government ministers of Lebanon
Armenian Revolutionary Federation politicians
Living people
1966 births
Lebanese people of Armenian descent